The 2011–12 Greek Basket League was the 72nd season of the Greek Basket League, the highest tier professional basketball league in Greece.  The 156-game regular season (24 games for each of the 13 teams) began on Saturday, October 22, 2011, and ended on Wednesday, April 11, 2012. The playoffs ended on June 2, 2012. The championship was held without the presence of Panellinios that withdrew because of economic problems. So the championship was held with only 13 teams.

Teams

Regular season

Standings 

As of matchday 26th (final) on April 11, 2012 

Pts=Points, Pld=Matches played, W=Matches won, L=Matches lost, F=Points for, A=Points against, D=Points difference

Playoffs 
Teams in bold won the playoff series. Numbers to the left of each team indicate the team's original playoff seeding. Numbers to the right indicate the score of each playoff game.

Bracket

Quarterfinal 1 

Game 1 

 Game 2

Quarterfinal 2 

 Game 1 

 Game 2

Quarterfinal 3 

 Game 1 

 Game 2

Quarterfinal 4 

 Game 1 

 Game 2

Semi-finals 1 

 Game 1 

Game 2 

 Game 3

Semi-finals 2 

 Game 1 

 Game 2 

 Game 3 

 Game 4

3rd Place play-offs 

 Game 1 

Game 2

 Game 3 

 Game 4 

 Game 5

Finals 

 Game 1

 Game 2 

 Game 3 

 Game 4 

Game 5

Final league standings

Kolossos and Rethymno forfeited their places in the Eurocup 2012–13 Regular Season.

Awards

MVP
 Vassilis Spanoulis – Olympiacos

Most Improved Player
 Georgios Printezis – Olympiacos

Best Defender
 Joey Dorsey – Olympiacos

Best Young Player
 Kostas Papanikolaou – Olympiacos

Best Coach
 Dusan Ivkovic – Olympiacos

Stats leaders 

Greek Basket League stats leaders are counted by totals, rather than averages, and include both regular season and playoff games.

Points

Rebounds

Assists

Awards

MVP
 Vassilis Spanoulis – Olympiacos

Finals MVP
 Vassilis Spanoulis – Olympiacos

Best Young Player
 Kostas Papanikolaou – Olympiacos

Best Defender
 Joey Dorsey – Olympiacos

Most Improved Player
 Georgios Printezis – Olympiacos

Coach of the Year
 Dušan Ivković – Olympiacos

Best Five

References

External links 
 Official Basket League Site 
 Official Basket League Site 
 Official Hellenic Basketball Federation Site 

Greek Basket League seasons
1
Greek